Our Love Story is a 2016 South Korean romantic drama film written and directed by Lee Hyun-ju, starring Lee Sang-hee and Ryu Sun-young.

Plot
Yoon-ju, an awkward and shy fine arts student, meets the eccentric bartender Ji-soo while searching for materials for a project installation. Though she had previously been in relationships with men, Yoon-ju finds herself falling for Ji-soo's charms and cautiously follows her desires.

Cast
 Lee Sang-hee as Yoon-ju 
 Ryu Sun-young as Ji-soo 
 Park Keun-rok as Young-ho 
 Im Sung-mi as Young-eun
 Kim Jong-su as Ji-soo's father
 Lee Ji-soo as Professor
 Park Joo-hwan as Byeong-gi
 Lee Da-yeong as Se-ah
 Han Geun-sup as Young-eun's boyfriend 
 Jeong A-mi as Ji-soo's mother
 Kim Gi-beom as Bar boss

Awards and nominations

References

External links

Our Love Story at Naver Movies 

South Korean romantic drama films
South Korean LGBT-related films
2016 films
2016 romantic drama films
2016 LGBT-related films
LGBT-related romantic drama films
Lesbian-related films
2016 directorial debut films
2010s South Korean films